Özgür Buldum (born 8 May 1976) is a well known Turkish music producer sharing 80% of Turkish commercial jingles sector with four other producers. He also has a good reputation in Turkish Pop Music having worked with great singers such as Tarkan, Candan Erçetin, Nazan Öncel, Meyra as arranger, producer, lyricist and composer.

External links
 
 Official web page
 [ Billboard]
 Artist Direct
 ICA 2006
 
 

1976 births
Turkish pop musicians
Advertising people
Living people